Citizen Soldier is a 1976 drama film written and directed by Michael Elsey and starring Dean Stockwell. The film follows a suicidal Vietnam War veteran who finds happiness in a relationship with a young actress. It was distributed by Troma Entertainment.   It was re-released in 1982 as a videocassette and again in 1984.

References

1976 films
1970s war drama films
American independent films
Troma Entertainment films
American war drama films
1976 independent films
1976 drama films
1970s English-language films
1970s American films